"Man of Simple Pleasures" is a song by English rock band Kasabian from the band's fourth studio album, Velociraptor! (2011). It was released as the fourth and final single from the record on 7 May 2012.

Release
The track was first released as a single A-side 10" vinyl on 7 May 2012.

A special EP was released together with the Italian 2012 reissue of Velociraptor!, including an exclusive remix of "Man of Simple Pleasures" featuring Italian rapper J-Ax.

Music video
A music video was released before the single, on 18 April. The video features a man riding on a bike in a city, wearing a mask and a baseball bat on his back. The man's shirt keeps changing to each lyric, and the video ends with him playing baseball in slow motion.

Track listing

Personnel
Kasabian
 Tom Meighan – lead vocals 
 Sergio Pizzorno – acoustic and electric guitar, backing vocals
 Chris Edwards – bass
 Ian Matthews – drums
Additional personnel
Daniel Ralph Martin – guitar, percussion

Charts

References

2012 singles
Kasabian songs
Songs written by Sergio Pizzorno
2011 songs
Columbia Records singles